Saint Martinville Senior High School (SMSH, also known locally as Senior High) is a high school in St. Martinville, Louisiana, United States. The school is the "Flagship School" of the St. Martin Parish School Board System. The school is administered by a Principal, two Assistant Principals, and a Dean of Students.

About
St. Martinville Senior High School is a 9th–12th Grade public school in St. Martinville, Louisiana. Enrollment in 2016–2017 is estimated to be around 750 students. It is located at 762 N Main St - St.Martinville, LA 70582

Athletics
St. Martinville Senior High athletics competes in the LHSAA.

Championships
Football championships
(2) State Championships: 1981, 1984

See also
 St. Martin Parish School Board
 List of high schools in Louisiana

External links
 http://smsh.saintmartin.schooldesk.net/Home/tabid/24662/Default.aspx
 https://www.usnews.com/education/best-high-schools/louisiana/districts/st-martin-parish/st-martinville-senior-high-school-8751

Schools in St. Martin Parish, Louisiana
Public high schools in Louisiana